"Darlin' Be Home Soon" (or "Darling Be Home Soon") is a song written by John Sebastian of the Lovin' Spoonful for the soundtrack of the 1966 Francis Ford Coppola film You're a Big Boy Now. It appeared on the Lovin' Spoonful's 1967 soundtrack album You're a Big Boy Now.
Sebastian performed his composition at Woodstock; it was the fourth song out of the five he performed at the 1969 music festival in White Lake, New York.

Writing and recording 
Coppola commissioned Sebastian to write music for the film, and for one scene wanted a song with a similar mood and tempo to "Monday, Monday" by the Mamas and the Papas.  Sebastian said that he wrote the song as "pleas for a partner to spend a few minutes talking before leaving.... [but] you never knew if the other person was actually there listening or was already gone".  Coppola approved the song, and it was recorded by the band but with session musician Billy LaVorgna rather than Joe Butler on drums. The arrangement was by Artie Schroeck.  After the recording was completed and the musicians left, the producer, Erik Jacobsen, discovered that an engineer had mistakenly erased Sebastian's vocal track, so he had to re-record it the next day.  Sebastian said: "What you hear on the record is me, a half hour after learning that my original vocal track had been erased.  You can even hear my voice quiver a little at the end.  That was me thinking about the vocal we lost and wanting to kill someone." It has been described as "...one of the most heartfelt songs about being away from a loved one, written from the point of view of a musician on the road writing a letter."

Billboard described the song as a "medium-paced rock ballad given that 'extra special' Lovin' Spoonful treatment" and should be a "smash" on the Billboard Hot 100.

Personnel 
 John Sebastian – vocals, acoustic guitar
 Zal Yanovsky – electric guitar
 Steve Boone – bass
 Billy LaVorgna – drums
 Artie Schroeck – piano, arranger
 Erik Jacobsen – producer

Chart performance 
"Darlin' Be Home Soon" was released as a single, reaching #15 on the US pop charts.

Other recordings of the song 
1967 – Bobby Darin, whose version reached #93 on the US charts.
1969 – Joe Cocker, on his album "Joe Cocker!"
1972 – The Association on their album "Waterbeds in Trinidad!". #104 US Billboard, #90 US Cashbox.
1972 – Slade – British band – did a live version on their album "Slade Alive".
1993 – The Barra MacNeils on their album Closer to Paradise, #23 Canadian charts, and Let Loose (1996, #65 UK as a single, and on the album Rollercoaster).

References 

Songs written by John Sebastian
Bobby Darin songs
1966 songs
1967 singles
The Lovin' Spoonful songs
Song recordings produced by Erik Jacobsen
Kama Sutra Records singles